Lunar Lander is a single-player arcade game in the Lunar Lander subgenre. It was developed by Atari, Inc. and released in August 1979. It was the most popular version to date of the "Lunar Lander" concept, surpassing the prior Moonlander and numerous text-based games, and most later versions of the concept are based on this Atari version.

The player controls a lunar landing module viewed from the side and attempts to land safely on the Moon. The player can rotate the module and burn fuel to fire a thruster, attempting to gently land on marked areas. The scenario resets after every successful landing or crash, with new terrain, until no fuel remains. Coins can be inserted at any time to buy more fuel.

Development of the game began with the creation of a vector graphics engine by Atari after the release of the 1978 Cinematronics game Space Wars. Engine co-designer Wendi Allen proposed using it to create a Lunar Lander game, a genre which dates to 1969. Allen and Rich Moore developed the game, which was Atari's first vector-based game and the first multiple-perspective video game, changing views to zoom in as the module approached the Moon.

Lunar Lander sold 4,830 units, a moderate success, but was soon overtaken by the November 1979 Asteroids, and 300 Asteroids units were shipped in Lunar Lander-branded cabinets. Lunar Lander was one of the first two games to be registered with the United States Copyright Office, though the prior games in the genre kept the gameplay from being patented. Lunar Lander was included in an art installation at the Dublin Science Gallery.

Gameplay
Lunar Lander is a single-player game in the Lunar Lander subgenre in which the player attempts to land a lunar landing module on the Moon. The game is displayed using black and white vector graphics and depicts a side-on view of the terrain and the landing module. At the top of the screen, the player is given information on the module's speed, altitude, and fuel, along with the score and time spent in the game. The terrain is jagged and has only a few flat areas appropriate for landing. The player controls the orientation of the module and fires the thruster to steer the module safely to a landing area. The module is always displayed in the center of the screen, with the terrain scrolling beneath it as it travels horizontally, wrapping the single screen-width of terrain endlessly. As the lander nears the terrain, the perspective changes to zoom in closer to the ship.

If the player successfully lands the module, they are awarded points based on how softly the module landed and the difficulty of the landing site and are awarded a small amount of fuel for good landings. The safe landing areas are highlighted with a flashing bonus multiplier, which is higher for smaller areas. If the module crashes—which happens if it is moving too fast, or rotated too far from vertical when it touches the ground, or landed on a not-flat area—then a small number of points is awarded. When the lander gets close to the surface, the view changes to a close-up view of the lander. The player has a limited amount of fuel, which is consumed by controlling the module. Whether the player lands safely or crashes, the game starts another round with a different set of terrain and the player's remaining fuel. The game ends when the module touches the ground after running out of fuel.

The game is controlled via two buttons that rotate the module left and right, a large handle that fires the thruster (proportionally to how hard it is pulled), and an "abort" button that rotates the module back to vertical and fires the thruster, burning a large amount of fuel in an attempt to stop the module from crashing. Each action uses fuel, and when the fuel runs out the module no longer responds to the controls. The game features four levels of difficulty which adjust the landing areas and module controls. The highest difficulty causes the module to continue rotating after it is turned until the player counters the rotation instead of only turning while the button is pressed. The player can adjust the game's difficulty at any time during play. Unlike other arcade games, Lunar Lander does not feature a time limit; instead, the game starts with a set amount of fuel and inserting additional quarters purchases more fuel, allowing indefinite gameplay. The amount of fuel gained per coin, including the initial game starting-coin, is adjustable by the operator to set levels ranging from 450 units to 900 units.

Development

The Lunar Lander concept was initially created in 1969 as a text-based game called Lunar, or alternately the Lunar Landing Game. Many further versions of the game were developed over the course of the next decade; by 1979 the style of game was collectively seen as its own subgenre. The first graphical version of the subgenre, Moonlander, was released in 1973 by DEC, which commissioned a real-time, graphical Lunar Lander game to demonstrate the capabilities of its new DEC GT40 graphics terminals.

After the release of the 1977 Cinematronics vector graphics game Space Wars, Atari began work on their own vector graphics engine, in which the graphics are constructed by drawn lines instead of pixels like in the more standard raster graphics engines. The initial hardware design work was done by Cyan Engineering, Atari's research and development subsidiary. Once it built an initial hardware concept, the project was passed on to Atari employee Wendi Allen, (née Howard Delman) who enhanced the prototype engine into one that could be used by game designers.  Once it was done, she proposed using the monochrome game engine for a Lunar Lander game. Allen had previously played Moonlander during a tour of NASA and had played one of the text-based Lunar Lander games in college. In Fall 1978 development of the game began, with Allen in charge of the hardware and Rich Moore, who had only been with Atari for a few months and who had also played a Lunar Lander game in college, focusing on the programming.

Development began with Moore drawing out the game's graphics on graph paper, after which the pair wrote out the game's code on paper for typists to transcribe. Allen and Moore worked closely together, bouncing ideas off each other as Moore proposed programming designs and Allen iterated the hardware design. One point of contention in the development process was the difficulty of the game; Allen initially wanted the module to move as realistically as possible, but they determined that the result was almost impossible to play. As Allen noted in an interview in 2010, "even the real lunar landers had computer assist!" Eventually, they settled on including four difficulty levels, as compared to Moonlanders three, though Allen has referred to the hardest level as "one of the most painful difficulty spikes in gaming".

Allen chose the large handle used to control the thruster: Atari initially planned to use a standard joystick, but he wanted a control with more physicality, including adding a rubber pad at the bottom to give players the impression that they could pull harder for a little more thrust. The thrust control has ten levels of thrust, as compared to the single on or off level of thrust in previous Lunar Landers, though Moore has noted that this gives players more incorrect options to choose from. The game's font was designed by Ed Logg and used for several other Atari vector graphics games. Several planned ideas had to be cut from the game during development. Allen has stated that chief among these was retaining a crater where the player's previous spaceships had crashed; it was cut as the new hardware could not draw enough lines fast enough to handle the detail. She also wanted to add in a McDonald's location easter egg, as was present in Moonlander. Over a year after development started, Lunar Lander was released in August 1979, just after the tenth anniversary of the first human Moon landing, though Atari did not link this connection in its marketing of the game.

Reception and legacy
Lunar Lander proved moderately commercially successful, selling 4,830 cabinets. Cash Box noted in September 1979 that the machines were very popular with customers. It was Atari's first vector graphics game and the first multiple-perspective video game with the inclusion of the up-close view of the lander. Atari developed a two-player version of the game, but only two prototypes were ever made as it did not enter production. The two-player version was cancelled as Lunar Landers popularity was soon overtaken by Atari's Asteroids (November 1979), which used the same vector graphics engine and which had initially been based on Lunar Landers code. Atari ceased production early on Lunar Lander in favor of shipping Asteroids games in Lunar Lander cabinets; the first 300 Asteroids games were released with Lunar Lander artwork on the side. The Atari Lunar Lander was the most popular version to date of the "Lunar Lander" concept, surpassing the prior Moonlander and text-based games, and most later versions of the concept are implicitly or explicitly based on the Atari version.

In 1977, Atari produced Star Ship for the Atari 2600, which contained several space-related games; one of these was titled Lunar Lander, though despite the name its gameplay involved landing on a surface while avoiding enemy spaceships instead of the gameplay of the arcade game. While Atari did not produce any true sequels or contemporary ports of the game, in 1980 Adventure International produced a version of the concept under the title Lunar Lander as part of a series of arcade game clones for the TRS-80 and Atari 8-bit computers, which, though featuring differences from the Atari version, was advertised as "an arcade game simulation". At least one other arcade game based on the Lunar Lander concept was developed around the same time, the non-vector graphics game Lunar Rescue by Taito. The Atari Lunar Lander has been included in several Atari compilation releases for various platforms starting in 2003, such as Atari: 80 Classic Games in One (2003, personal computer), the Atari Flashback 2 console (2005), Millipede / Super Breakout / Lunar Lander (2005, Game Boy Advance), Retro Atari Classics (2005, Nintendo DS), Atari Masterpieces (2005, N-Gage), Atari Classics Evolved (2007, PlayStation Portable), Atari Greatest Hits (2010, Nintendo DS, Android, iOS), and Atari Flashback Classics Volume 1 (2017, PlayStation 4, Xbox One).

In 1980, Asteroids and Lunar Lander became the first two games to be registered in the United States Copyright Office, though Burness has claimed that Atari also attempted to patent the game design, which was rejected due to his prior Moonlander. In 2012, for the 40th anniversary of Atari's founding, it released a set of its early games as browser-based games as the "Atari Arcade"; Lunar Lander was one of the initial set of eight games. That same year, Lumen Prize-winner Seb Lee-Delisle presented his "Lunar Trails" art installation at the Science Gallery in Dublin, in which a machine draws out the cumulative paths taken by players of a Lunar Lander arcade game.

See also
 Golden age of arcade video games

References

Sources

External links
 
 Revised browser-based version of Lunar Lander at the Atari Arcade
 Lunar trails exhibition at the Dublin Science Gallery

1979 video games
Arcade video games
Atari arcade games
Space flight simulator games
Vector arcade video games
Video games developed in the United States
Video games set on the Moon